In physics, time is defined by its measurement: time is what a clock reads.  In classical, non-relativistic physics, it is a scalar quantity (often denoted by the symbol ) and, like length, mass, and charge, is usually described as a fundamental quantity. Time can be combined mathematically with other physical quantities to derive other concepts such as motion, kinetic energy and time-dependent fields.  Timekeeping is a complex of technological and scientific issues, and part of the foundation of recordkeeping.

Markers of time

Before there were clocks, time was measured by those physical processes which were understandable to each epoch of civilization:
the first appearance (see: heliacal rising) of Sirius to mark the flooding of the Nile each year
the periodic succession of night and day, seemingly eternally
the position on the horizon of the first appearance of the sun at dawn
the position of the sun in the sky
the marking of the moment of noontime during the day
the length of the shadow cast by a gnomon

Eventually, it became possible to characterize the passage of time with instrumentation, using operational definitions. Simultaneously, our conception of time has evolved, as shown below.

The unit of measurement of time: the second
In the International System of Units (SI), the unit of time is the second. It is a SI base unit, and has been defined since 1967 as "the duration of  [cycles] of the radiation corresponding to the transition between the two hyperfine levels of the ground state of the caesium 133 atom". This definition is based on the operation of a caesium atomic clock. These clocks became practical for use as primary reference standards after about 1955, and have been in use ever since.

The state of the art in timekeeping

The UTC timestamp in use worldwide is an atomic time standard. The relative accuracy of such a time standard is currently on the order of 10−15 (corresponding to 1 second in approximately 30 million years). The smallest time step considered theoretically observable is called the Planck time, which is approximately 5.391×10−44 seconds – many orders of magnitude below the resolution of current time standards.

The caesium atomic clock became practical after 1950, when advances in electronics enabled reliable measurement of the microwave frequencies it generates. As further advances occurred,  atomic clock research has progressed to ever-higher frequencies, which can provide higher accuracy and higher precision. Clocks based on these techniques have been developed, but are not yet in use as primary reference standards.

Conceptions of time

Galileo, Newton, and most people up until the 20th century thought that time was the same for everyone everywhere. This is the basis for timelines, where time is a parameter. The modern understanding of time is based on Einstein's theory of relativity, in which rates of time run differently depending on relative motion, and space and time are merged into spacetime, where we live on a world line rather than a timeline. In this view time is a coordinate. According to the prevailing cosmological model of the Big Bang theory, time itself began as part of the entire Universe about 13.8 billion years ago.

Regularities in nature

In order to measure time, one can record the number of occurrences (events) of some periodic phenomenon. The regular recurrences of the seasons, the motions of the sun, moon and stars were noted and tabulated for millennia, before the laws of physics were formulated. The sun was the arbiter of the flow of time, but time was known only to the hour for millennia, hence, the use of the gnomon was known across most of the world, especially Eurasia, and at least as far southward as the jungles of Southeast Asia.

In particular, the astronomical observatories maintained for religious purposes became accurate enough to ascertain the regular motions of the stars, and even some of the planets.

At first, timekeeping was done by hand by priests, and then for commerce, with watchmen to note time as part of their duties.
The tabulation of the equinoxes, the sandglass, and the water clock became more and more accurate, and finally reliable.  For ships at sea, boys were used to turn the sandglasses and to call the hours.

Mechanical clocks
Richard of Wallingford (1292–1336), abbot of St. Albans Abbey, famously built a mechanical clock as an astronomical orrery about 1330.

By the time of Richard of Wallingford, the use of ratchets and gears allowed the towns of Europe to create mechanisms to display the time on their respective town clocks; by the time of the scientific revolution, the clocks became miniaturized enough for families to share a personal clock, or perhaps a pocket watch. At first, only kings could afford them. Pendulum clocks were widely used in the 18th and 19th century. They have largely been replaced in general use by quartz and digital clocks. Atomic clocks can theoretically keep accurate time for millions of years. They are appropriate for standards and scientific use.

Galileo: the flow of time 

In 1583, Galileo Galilei (1564–1642) discovered that a pendulum's harmonic motion has a constant period, which he learned by timing the motion of a swaying lamp in harmonic motion at mass at the cathedral of Pisa, with his pulse.

In his Two New Sciences (1638), Galileo used a water clock to measure the time taken for a bronze ball to roll a known distance down an inclined plane; this clock was:
...a large vessel of water placed in an elevated position; to the bottom of this vessel was soldered a pipe of small diameter giving a thin jet of water, which we collected in a small glass during the time of each descent, whether for the whole length of the channel or for a part of its length; the water thus collected was weighed, after each descent, on a very accurate balance; the differences and ratios of these weights gave us the differences and ratios of the times, and this with such accuracy that although the operation was repeated many, many times, there was no appreciable discrepancy in the results.

Galileo's experimental setup to measure the literal flow of time, in order to describe the motion of a ball, preceded Isaac Newton's statement in his Principia, "I do not define time, space, place and motion, as being well known to all."

The Galilean transformations assume that time is the same for all reference frames.

Newton's physics: linear time

In or around 1665, when Isaac Newton (1643–1727) derived the motion of objects falling under gravity, the first clear formulation for mathematical physics of a treatment of time began: linear time, conceived as a universal clock.

Absolute, true, and mathematical time, of itself, and from its own nature flows equably without regard to anything external, and by another name is called duration: relative, apparent, and common time, is some sensible and external (whether accurate or unequable)  measure of duration by the means of motion, which is commonly used instead of true time; such as an hour, a day, a month, a year.
The water clock mechanism described by Galileo was engineered to provide laminar flow of the water during the experiments, thus providing a constant flow of water for the durations of the experiments, and embodying what Newton called duration.

In this section, the relationships listed below treat time as a parameter which serves as an index to the behavior of the physical system under consideration. Because Newton's fluents treat a linear flow of time (what he called mathematical time), time could be considered to be a linearly varying parameter, an abstraction of the march of the hours on the face of a clock. Calendars and ship's logs could then be mapped to the march of the hours, days, months, years and centuries.

Thermodynamics and the paradox of irreversibility

By 1798, Benjamin Thompson (1753–1814) had discovered that work could be transformed to heat without limit – a precursor of the conservation of energy or
1st law of thermodynamics
In 1824 Sadi Carnot (1796–1832) scientifically analyzed the steam engine with his Carnot cycle, an abstract engine. Rudolf Clausius (1822–1888) noted a measure of disorder, or entropy, which affects the continually decreasing amount of free energy which is available to a Carnot engine in the:
2nd law of thermodynamics
 
Thus the continual march of a thermodynamic system, from lesser to greater entropy, at any given temperature, defines an arrow of time. In particular, Stephen Hawking identifies three arrows of time:
Psychological arrow of time – our perception of an inexorable flow.
Thermodynamic arrow of time – distinguished by the growth of entropy.
Cosmological arrow of time – distinguished by the expansion of the universe.

With time, entropy increases in an isolated thermodynamic system. In contrast, Erwin Schrödinger (1887–1961) pointed out that life depends on a "negative entropy flow". Ilya Prigogine (1917–2003) stated that other thermodynamic systems which, like life, are also far from equilibrium, can also exhibit stable spatio-temporal structures that reminisce life. Soon afterward, the Belousov–Zhabotinsky reactions were reported, which demonstrate oscillating colors in a chemical solution. These nonequilibrium thermodynamic branches reach a bifurcation point, which is unstable, and another thermodynamic branch becomes stable in its stead.

Electromagnetism and the speed of light

In 1864, James Clerk Maxwell (1831–1879) presented a combined theory of electricity and magnetism.  He combined all the laws then known relating to those two phenomenon into four equations.  These equations  are known as Maxwell's equations for electromagnetism; they allow for solutions in the form of electromagnetic waves and propagate at a fixed speed, c, regardless of the velocity of the electric charge that generated them.

The fact that light is predicted to always travel at speed c would be incompatible with Galilean relativity if Maxwell's equations were assumed to hold in any inertial frame (reference frame with constant velocity), because the Galilean transformations predict the speed to decrease (or increase) in the reference frame of an observer traveling parallel (or antiparallel) to the light.

It was expected that there was one absolute reference frame, that of the luminiferous aether, in which Maxwell's equations held unmodified in the known form.

The Michelson–Morley experiment failed to detect any difference in the relative speed of light due to the motion of the Earth relative to the luminiferous aether, suggesting that Maxwell's equations did, in fact, hold in all frames. In 1875, Hendrik Lorentz (1853–1928) discovered Lorentz transformations, which left Maxwell's equations unchanged, allowing Michelson and Morley's negative result to be explained. Henri Poincaré (1854–1912) noted the importance of Lorentz's transformation and popularized it. In particular, the railroad car description can be found in Science and Hypothesis, which was published before Einstein's articles of 1905.

The Lorentz transformation predicted space contraction and time dilation; until 1905, the former was interpreted as a physical contraction of objects moving with respect to the aether, due to the modification of the intermolecular forces (of electric nature), while the latter was thought to be just a mathematical stipulation.

Einstein's physics: spacetime

Albert Einstein's 1905 special relativity challenged the notion of absolute time, and could only formulate a definition of synchronization for clocks that mark a linear flow of time:
 Einstein showed that if the speed of light is not changing between reference frames, space and time must be so that the moving observer will measure the same speed of light as the stationary one because velocity is defined by space and time:

 where r is position and t is time.

Indeed, the Lorentz transformation (for two reference frames in relative motion, whose x axis is directed in the direction of the relative velocity)

can be said to "mix" space and time in a way similar to the way a Euclidean rotation around the z axis mixes x and y coordinates. Consequences of this include relativity of simultaneity. More specifically, the Lorentz transformation is a hyperbolic rotation  which is a change of coordinates in the four-dimensional Minkowski space, a dimension of which is ct. (In Euclidean space an ordinary rotation  is the corresponding change of coordinates.) We would need a similar factor in Euclidean space if, for example, we measured width in nautical miles and depth in feet. In physics, sometimes units of measurement in which c = 1 are used to simplify equations.

Time in a "moving" reference frame is shown to run more slowly than in a "stationary" one by the following relation (which can be derived by the Lorentz transformation by putting ∆x′ = 0, ∆τ = ∆t′):

where:
∆τ is the time between two events as measured in the moving reference frame in which they occur at the same place (e.g. two ticks on a moving clock); it is called the proper time between the two events;
∆t is the time between these same two events, but as measured in the stationary reference frame;
v is the speed of the moving reference frame relative to the stationary one;
c is the speed of light.

Moving objects therefore are said to show a slower passage of time. This is known as time dilation.

These transformations are only valid for two frames at constant relative velocity. Naively applying them to other situations gives rise to such paradoxes as the twin paradox.

That paradox can be resolved using for instance Einstein's General theory of relativity, which uses Riemannian geometry, geometry in accelerated, noninertial reference frames.  Employing the metric tensor which describes Minkowski space:

Einstein developed a geometric solution to Lorentz's transformation that preserves Maxwell's equations.  His field equations give an exact relationship between the measurements of space and time in a given region of spacetime and the energy density of that region.

Einstein's equations predict that time should be altered by the presence of gravitational fields (see the Schwarzschild metric):

Where:

 is the change in coordinate time, or the interval of coordinate time.

 is the gravitational constant

 is the mass generating the field

 is the change in proper time , or the interval of proper time.

Or one could use the following simpler approximation:

That is, the stronger the gravitational field (and, thus, the larger the acceleration), the more slowly time runs. The predictions of time dilation are confirmed by particle acceleration experiments and cosmic ray evidence, where moving particles decay more slowly than their less energetic counterparts.  Gravitational time dilation gives rise to the phenomenon of gravitational redshift and Shapiro signal travel time delays near massive objects such as the sun.  The Global Positioning System must also adjust signals to account for this effect.

According to Einstein's general theory of relativity, a freely moving particle traces a history in spacetime that maximises its proper time. This phenomenon is also referred to as the principle of maximal aging, and was described by Taylor and Wheeler as:
"Principle of Extremal Aging: The path a free object takes between two events in spacetime is the path for which the time lapse between these events, recorded on the object's wristwatch, is an extremum."

Einstein's theory was motivated by the assumption that every point in the universe can be treated as a 'center', and that correspondingly, physics must act the same in all reference frames.  His simple and elegant theory shows that time is relative to an inertial frame.  In an inertial frame, Newton's first law holds; it has its own local geometry, and therefore its own measurements of space and time; there is no 'universal clock'''. An act of synchronization must be performed between two systems, at the least.

 Time in quantum mechanics 

There is a time parameter in the equations of quantum mechanics. The Schrödinger equation is

One solution can be
.
where 
is called the time evolution operator, and H is the Hamiltonian.

But the Schrödinger picture shown above is equivalent to the Heisenberg picture, which enjoys a similarity to the Poisson brackets of classical mechanics. The Poisson brackets are superseded by a nonzero commutator, say [H,A] for observable A, and Hamiltonian H:

This equation denotes an uncertainty relation in quantum physics. For example, with time (the observable A), the energy E (from the Hamiltonian H) gives:

where
 is the uncertainty in energy
 is the uncertainty in time
 is Planck's constant
The more precisely one measures the duration of a sequence of events, the less precisely one can measure the energy associated with that sequence, and vice versa.  This equation is different from the standard uncertainty principle, because time is not an operator in quantum mechanics.

Corresponding commutator relations also hold for momentum p and position q, which are conjugate variables of each other, along with a corresponding uncertainty principle in momentum and position, similar to the energy and time relation above.

Quantum mechanics explains the properties of the periodic table of the elements. Starting with Otto Stern's and Walter Gerlach's experiment with molecular beams in a magnetic field, Isidor Rabi (1898–1988), was able to modulate the magnetic resonance of the beam. In 1945 Rabi then suggested that this technique be the basis of a clock using the resonant frequency of an atomic beam.
In 2021 Jun Ye of JILA in Boulder Colorado observed time dilatation in the difference in the rate of optical lattice clock ticks at the top of a cloud of strontium atoms, than at the bottom of that cloud, a column one millimeter tall, under the influence of gravity.

Dynamical systems
See dynamical systems and chaos theory, dissipative structures

One could say that time is a parameterization of a dynamical system that allows the geometry of the system to be manifested and operated on. It has been asserted that time is an implicit consequence of chaos (i.e. nonlinearity/irreversibility): the characteristic time, or rate of information entropy production, of a system. Mandelbrot introduces intrinsic time in his book Multifractals and 1/f noise.
Time crystals

Khemani, Moessner, and Sondhi define a time crystal as a "stable, conservative, macroscopic clock".

Signalling
Signalling is one application of the electromagnetic waves described above. In general, a signal is part of communication between parties and places. One example might be a yellow ribbon tied to a tree, or the ringing of a church bell. A signal can be part of a conversation, which involves a protocol. Another signal might be the position of the hour hand on a town clock or a railway station. An interested party might wish to view that clock, to learn the time.  See: Time ball, an early form of Time signal.

We as observers can still signal different parties and places as long as we live within their past light cone. But we cannot receive signals from those parties and places outside our past light cone.

Along with the formulation of the equations for the electromagnetic wave, the field of telecommunication could be founded. 

In 19th century telegraphy, electrical circuits, some spanning continents and oceans, could transmit codes - simple dots, dashes and spaces. From this, a series of technical issues have emerged; see :Category:Synchronization. But it is safe to say that our signalling systems can be only approximately synchronized, a plesiochronous condition, from which jitter need be eliminated.

That said, systems can be synchronized (at an engineering approximation), using technologies like GPS. The GPS satellites must account for the effects of gravitation and other relativistic factors in their circuitry. See: Self-clocking signal.

Technology for timekeeping standards
The primary time standard in the U.S. is currently NIST-F1, a laser-cooled Cs fountain, the latest in a series of time and frequency standards, from the ammonia-based atomic clock (1949) to the caesium-based NBS-1 (1952) to NIST-7 (1993). The respective clock uncertainty declined from 10,000 nanoseconds per day to 0.5 nanoseconds per day in 5 decades. In 2001 the clock uncertainty for NIST-F1 was 0.1 nanoseconds/day. Development of increasingly accurate frequency standards is underway.

In this time and frequency standard, a population of caesium atoms is laser-cooled to temperatures of one microkelvin. The atoms collect in a ball shaped by six lasers, two for each spatial dimension, vertical (up/down), horizontal (left/right), and back/forth. The vertical lasers push the caesium ball through a microwave cavity. As the ball is cooled, the caesium population cools to its ground state and emits light at its natural frequency, stated in the definition of second above. Eleven physical effects are accounted for in the emissions from the caesium population, which are then controlled for in the NIST-F1 clock. These results are reported to BIPM.

Additionally, a reference hydrogen maser is also reported to BIPM as a frequency standard for TAI (international atomic time).

The measurement of time is overseen by BIPM (Bureau International des Poids et Mesures), located in Sèvres, France, which ensures uniformity of measurements and their traceability to the International System of Units (SI) worldwide. BIPM operates under authority of the Metre Convention, a diplomatic treaty between fifty-one nations, the Member States of the Convention, through a series of Consultative Committees, whose members are the respective national metrology laboratories.

Time in cosmology

The equations of general relativity predict a non-static universe. However, Einstein accepted only a static universe, and modified the Einstein field equation to reflect this by adding the cosmological constant, which he later described as the biggest mistake of his life.  But in 1927, Georges Lemaître (1894–1966) argued, on the basis of general relativity, that the universe originated in a primordial explosion. At the fifth Solvay conference, that year, Einstein brushed him off with "" (“Your math is correct, but your physics is abominable”). In 1929, Edwin Hubble (1889–1953) announced his discovery of the expanding universe.  The current generally accepted cosmological model, the Lambda-CDM model, has a positive cosmological constant and thus not only an expanding universe but an accelerating expanding universe.

If the universe were expanding, then it must have been much smaller and therefore hotter and denser in the past. George Gamow (1904–1968) hypothesized that the abundance of the elements in the Periodic Table of the Elements, might be accounted for by nuclear reactions in a hot dense universe. He was disputed by Fred Hoyle (1915–2001), who invented the term 'Big Bang' to disparage it. Fermi and others noted that this process would have stopped after only the light elements were created, and thus did not account for the abundance of heavier elements.

Gamow's prediction was a 5–10-kelvin black-body radiation temperature for the universe, after it cooled during the expansion. This was corroborated by Penzias and Wilson in 1965. Subsequent experiments arrived at a 2.7 kelvins temperature, corresponding to an age of the universe of 13.8 billion years after the Big Bang.

This dramatic result has raised issues: what happened between the singularity of the Big Bang and the Planck time, which, after all, is the smallest observable time.  When might have time separated out from the spacetime foam; there are only hints based on broken symmetries (see Spontaneous symmetry breaking, Timeline of the Big Bang, and the articles in :Category:Physical cosmology).

General relativity gave us our modern notion of the expanding universe that started in the Big Bang.  Using relativity and quantum theory we have been able to roughly reconstruct the history of the universe.  In our epoch, during which electromagnetic waves can propagate without being disturbed by conductors or charges, we can see the stars, at great distances from us, in the night sky. (Before this epoch, there was a time, before the universe cooled enough for electrons and nuclei to combine into atoms about 377,000 years after the Big Bang, during which starlight would not have been visible over large distances.)

Reprise
Ilya Prigogine's reprise is "Time precedes existence". In contrast to the views of Newton, of Einstein, and of quantum physics, which offer a symmetric view of time (as discussed above), Prigogine points out that statistical and thermodynamic physics can explain irreversible phenomena, as well as the arrow of time and the Big Bang.

See also
 Relativistic dynamics
 :Category:systems of units
 Time in astronomy

References

Further reading
 Boorstein, Daniel J., The Discoverers. Vintage. February 12, 1985. 
 Dieter Zeh, H., The physical basis of the direction of time. Springer. 
 Kuhn, Thomas S., The Structure of Scientific Revolutions. 
 Mandelbrot, Benoît, Multifractals and 1/f noise. Springer Verlag. February 1999. 
 Prigogine, Ilya (1984), Order out of Chaos. 
 Serres, Michel, et al., "Conversations on Science, Culture, and Time (Studies in Literature and Science)". March, 1995. 
 Stengers, Isabelle, and Ilya Prigogine, Theory Out of Bounds''. University of Minnesota Press. November 1997.

External links

 

 
Philosophy of physics
Time
Timekeeping